Vivian Berkeley (born August 9, 1941) is a Canadian two-time World Blind Lawn Bowling Champion, 1996 Paralympic Games Silver Medalist and 2002 Commonwealth Games Bronze Medalist.

Over her 21-year decorated career (1994–2015), Vivian would accumulate a total of 60 medals; including 22 straight Provincial Gold medals, 21 National Gold medals (16 straight), along with an impressive 17 International medals from 8 countries (2 Gold, 10 Silver, 5 Bronze). Berkeley is accredited to helping build the sport of lawn bowls for the blind and visually-impaired in Canada and abroad.

On November 7th 2021, Vivian was Inducted into the Canadian Disability Hall of Fame (CDHF). Founded by the Canadian Foundation for Physically Disabled Persons (CFPDP), this public exhibit is located in Metro Hall in downtown Toronto Ontario. The Induction Ceremony took place on October 20th 2022, at the Fairmont Royal York in downtown Toronto. 

On April 24th 2022, Vivian was inducted into the Waterloo Region Hall of Fame, located on the second floor of the Ken Seiling Waterloo Region Museum Kitchener Ontario.

"As an athlete I feel that year-round physical training and mental preparation are the keys to success. To reach your goals you must be prepared to be persistent and dedicated to your sport. An athlete must be able to accept winning as well as defeat, and meet new challenges head on. In order to succeed in any sport, this philosophy should be applied on a daily basis." - Vivian Berkeley

Personal life

Born in Glace Bay, Nova Scotia, Vivian received her primary and secondary schooling at the Halifax School for the Blind, in Halifax, Nova Scotia, where she won a trophy in competitive swimming, before graduating in the mid-1950s. Vivian would move to Kitchener, Ontario in 1968, where she would work in the radiology department at Grand River Hospital for eight years, as a darkroom technician. After leaving her job at the hospital, Vivian would become an in-classroom teachers aide for the Waterloo Catholic District School Board, two days a week, for 16 years. She also delivered the K-W Record newspaper for several years and took up the hobby of breeding budgie birds. Berkeley has always been very involved within her community, contributing to many committees and service groups. Her main objective, to improve the safety, mobility, and well-being of the blind and visually-impaired in the Waterloo Region. Vivian has a husband Richard (of 50 years), two children Laura-Lee and Michael, and a granddaughter Samantha. She also has a guide dog, a black Labrador retriever named Angora. In her spare time Vivian enjoys knitting afghans, puzzles, audio books, and listening to her favourite team the Toronto Blue Jays, as she "loves Jerry Howarth's work."

Lawn Bowls Career

Non-competitive play (1989–1993) 
Berkeley's lawn bowling career has span over 25 years, beginning in 1989. At the time she was also competing in Shuffleboard on the provincial level, along with five-pin and ten-pin bowling. Vivian initially played out of the Rockway Golf and Country Club in Kitchener, Ontario, however its lawn bowling club was forced to close at the end of 1996 for the expansion of its golf course. The following year, a new local lawn bowling club would open its doors, Heritage Greens. For the first several years, Vivian would just play one night a week with the other blind and visually-impaired members. Berkeley has had several coaches throughout her career, all of them playing a pivotal role in helping her achieve success, including Don Mayne (1989–2004), Jean McCron (2005–2013), and Betty Mayne (2014–2015) (Don's wife), to name a few. Vivian stated that "I started (lawn) bowls because I enjoy sports and the challenge of competitions."

Competitive career (1994–2015)

Provincial

National

International

Awards and honours
Paralympic Games Torch Bearer - Royal LePage WhyNot Marathon in Kitchener. PICTURE INCLUDED (1996)
Fire Prevention Ambassador of North America - Inducted alongside local sports heroes Professional Boxing Champion Fitz Vanderpool and National Softball Champion Karen Snelgrove. PICTURE INCLUDED (1996)
Kitchener Sports Association (KSA) Wall of Fame - Paralympics profile picture on display inside the Kitchener Memorial Auditorium. PICTURE INCLUDED (1996)
House of Commons Canada - Recognized with other members of the Olympic and Paralympic Summer Games, such as Donovan Bailey and Clara Hughes. TRANSCRIPT (1996)
Letter from Prime Minister, Jean Chretien. "On behalf of all Canadians, I am delighted to offer you my warmest congratulations on your silver medal win at the X Paralympiad." PICTURE INCLUDED (1996)
Meeting Walter Gretzky. "He (Walter) recognized me from a previous meeting and approached me. “Don (Mayne) and I met him in Scotland in 1999 and had dinner with him at his expense. He knew about my lawn bowling” - Vivian Berkeley (1999)
Chatelaine Presents Who's Who of Canadian Women 1999-2000 magazine feature (1999)
Represented Canada at the Commonwealth Games as the oldest athlete at age 61 (2002)
Lions Foundation of Canada - Life Membership Recipient (2006)
AthletesCAN Paralympic Athlete Council - Elected as an Interim Member for a meeting in Whitehorse, Yukon (2007)
International Blind Bowls Association (IBBA) - Elected to the World Executive (2009)
Guide Dogs For the Blind Newsletter - Article written by Vivian about her previous guide dog Paka (2011)
Competed at the Blind and Visually-Impaired Curling Provincials (2011)
Award Recipient from Heritage Greens Lawn Bowling Club in Kitchener. "In recognition for the work she has done for the visually-impaired in lawn bowling." PICTURE INCLUDED (2011)
City of Kitchener Athletic Awards -  Award Recipient (1989-2013)
Canadian Disability Hall of Fame (CDHF) - Plaque with name and face etching is displayed inside Metro Hall, Toronto, Ontario (2021)

Community Involvement
Blind Bowls Association of Canada (BBAC) Past-President. Established by Berkeley to represent and promote the interests of blind and visually-impaired lawn bowlers locally and abroad (2007)
Canadian Council of the Blind (CCB) Director of Public Relations, Kitchener District Club (1969-1973)
Canadian Council of the Blind (CCB) President, Kitchener District Club (1991-2001) 
Canadian National Institute for the Blind (CNIB) Volunteer, Kitchener (1992-1997)
City of Kitchener Barrier-Free Advisory Committee Member (1994-2012)
City of Kitchener Fire Safety Committee Member (1997)
Lioness Club of Kitchener (2005)
Ontario Lawn Bowls Association of the Blind (OLBAB) President (1997-2001)
Pioneer Lions Club of Kitchener Past-President (2005-2006) 
Royal Canadian Legion, Branch 50 Kitchener (2008-2017)
Waterloo Catholic District School Board (WCDSB) Teachers Aid Volunteer (1985-2000) *two days per week
Waterloo Regional Block Parent Program (1987-1999)

References 

1941 births
Living people
Paralympic lawn bowls players of Canada
Paralympic silver medalists for Canada
Lawn bowls players at the 1996 Summer Paralympics
Visually impaired category Paralympic competitors
Medalists at the 1996 Summer Paralympics
Paralympic medalists in lawn bowls
Commonwealth Games bronze medallists for Canada
Bowls players at the 2002 Commonwealth Games
Commonwealth Games medallists in lawn bowls
Canadian Disability Hall of Fame
Medallists at the 2002 Commonwealth Games
Canadian blind people